In enzymology, a steroid sulfotransferase is an enzyme that catalyzes the chemical reaction

3'-phosphoadenylyl sulfate + a phenolic steroid  adenosine 3',5'-bisphosphate + steroid O-sulfate

Thus, the two substrates of this enzyme are 3'-phosphoadenylyl sulfate and phenolic steroid, whereas its two products are adenosine 3',5'-bisphosphate and steroid O-sulfate.

This enzyme belongs to the family of transferases, specifically the sulfotransferases, which transfer sulfur-containing groups.  The systematic name of this enzyme class is 3'-phosphoadenylyl-sulfate:phenolic-steroid sulfotransferase. This enzyme is also called steroid alcohol sulfotransferase.  This enzyme participates in steroid metabolism.

Genes
Of 62 sulfotransferase genes in the human genome, 16 represent cytoplasmic sulfotransferases, and of these 16 cytoplasmic sulfotransferases, five have been found to act as steroid sulfotransferases. These five sulfotransferase genes are SULT1A1, SULT1E1, and SULT2A1, as well as the two isoforms of SULT2B1, SULT2B1a and SULT2B1b. Their substrate specificity is as follows:

 SULT1A1: Estradiol (to estradiol sulfate)
 SULT1E1:  (to  sulfate); Estrone (to estrone sulfate); Estradiol (to estradiol sulfate)
 SULT2A1:  (to  sulfate); Androsterone (to androsterone sulfate); Pregnenolone (to pregnenolone sulfate)
 SULT2B1a: Pregnenolone (to pregnenolone sulfate)
 SULT2B1b: Cholesterol (to cholesterol sulfate)

Traditionally, steroid sulfotransferases have been named according to their preferred substrate, for instance estrogen sulfotransferase (SULT1E1) and DHEA sulfotransferase (SULT2A1). However, cytosolic steroid sulfotransferases show broad substrate specificity, and SULT1E1 and SULT2A1 are not the only steroid sulfotransferases that sulfate estrogens and DHEA, respectively.

See also
 Estrogen sulfotransferase
 Estrone sulfotransferase
 Steroid sulfatase
 Steroidogenic enzyme

References

 

EC 2.8.2
Enzymes of unknown structure